Garry Peter Lyon (born 13 September 1967) is a former professional Australian rules football player and was captain of the Melbourne Football Club in the Australian Football League (AFL). Since his retirement from football, he has been mainly an Australian rules football media personality, featuring on television, radio and in newspapers. He has also coached during the International Rules Series. He is the most recent VFL/AFL player to kick ten goals in a finals match, having done so in the 1994 Second Semi-Final against Footscray, and the first since Geelong's George Goninon in 1951, 43 years prior.

Early life
Lyon, the son of former Hawthorn player Peter Lyon, was born in Devonport, Tasmania. In his youth he moved to Victoria.

Career

VFL/AFL
Lyon was recruited from the Kyabram Football Club and debuted in 1986 with the Melbourne Football Club, playing in the 1988 VFL Grand Final. He quickly became a dominant player in the Victorian Football League (VFL), later renamed the Australian Football League (AFL), winning his first Melbourne best and fairest award in 1990. He became Melbourne's captain in 1991 and eventually became the longest-serving Melbourne captain in club history until he was released from the role after the 1997 season due to the club's belief that he would suffer from too many injuries. Lyon was known for playing with many back injuries, and his presence on the field despite such adversity saw him as an inspiration to teammates.

Lyon finished his career having won two Melbourne best and fairest awards and being named in three All-Australian teams. His career ended as a result of increasing back problems. A broken leg, footage of which was often played on The AFL Footy Show, ended his 1987 season. In the end, he finished with 226 VFL/AFL games and 426 goals in 1999, giving him the fourth-best all-time goal tally for a Melbourne player.

State of Origin
Lyon had a successful State of Origin career for Victoria, first being selected in 1988 against Western Australia. In 1989 he played in a famous game against South Australia, where Tony Lockett, Jason Dunstall and Dermott Brereton all played in the same forward line, performing well being named in the best players. In 1991, Lyon scored one goal against South Australia. He was selected again in 1992 against the same opposition. In 1993, he performed on the big stage in the State of Origin Carnival grand final against South Australia, kicking three goals and being named in the best players. In 1994, he was named Captain of Victoria, in what he has described as "a great honour". In 1995, he was named vice-captain against South Australia, scoring one goal. Lyon is a big supporter of Victoria and State of Origin and has said in reference to playing State of Origin that he "loved it". He is also a big supporter of State of Origin being reintroduced, and he has described training and playing with the best players in the game as a "dream come true" and "it took the experience of playing football to another level". He has said that the great players of today should be afforded the same honour.

Media career
Lyon's radio career began in the late 1990s on 3AW, and in 2004 he hosted Morning Glory on SEN 1116. In 2005, he returned to 3AW, and he appeared on Sports Today as well as providing special comments for the station's AFL coverage. In 2007, Lyon moved to Triple M where he provided special comments on Friday Night and Saturday afternoon matches until the end of 2015.

Lyon became a regular panelist on The AFL Footy Show late in his playing career. In 2006, alongside James Brayshaw, he took the hosting reins of the program after Eddie McGuire became CEO of the Nine Network. Previously he had worked alongside Brayshaw on The Sunday Footy Show and in 2005 on Any Given Sunday, as well as being a presenter of the Melbourne Commonwealth Games 2006 coverage on Nine. In 2007 he became a panelist on the program Footy Classified.

Lyon is a columnist for The Age newspaper and has co-authored children's books, including those in the Specky Magee series with Felice Arena. 

In 2017, Lyon returned to SEN to co-host it’s breakfast program with Tim Watson. Later that year, Lyon ended his long association with the Nine Network to join Fox Footy as a commentator and panelist on On The Couch. In 2022, Lyon commenced hosting On The Couch in addition to Friday Night Football for the station.

Following the Melbourne premiership win, Lyon had the honour of presenting the 2021 AFL premiership cup to captain Max Gawn and coach Simon Goodwin in Perth following the Demons winning their first flag in 57 years.

Coaching
Since his retirement, Lyon has dabbled in coaching. He has coached the Australian international rules football team, debuting in 2001, and he remained coach for four successive seasons before being replaced by Kevin Sheedy. His International rules record is two wins from four games.

While many thought he might be a future coach of the Melbourne Football Club, Lyon chose not to pursue this path. In 2009, he coached the Victorian under-16 representative side at the AFL championships.

Playing statistics

|- style="background-color: #EAEAEA"
! scope="row" style="text-align:center" | 1986
|style="text-align:center;"|
| 3 || 20 || 26 || 18 || 215 || 65 || 280 || 70 ||  || 1.3 || 0.9 || 10.8 || 3.3 || 14.0 || 3.5 || 
|-
! scope="row" style="text-align:center" | 1987
|style="text-align:center;"|
| 3 || 18 || 28 || 20 || 189 || 76 || 265 || 69 || 21 || 1.6 || 1.1 || 10.5 || 4.2 || 14.7 || 3.8 || 1.2
|- style="background:#eaeaea;"
! scope="row" style="text-align:center" | 1988
|style="text-align:center;"|
| 3 || 22 || 41 || 30 || 278 || 82 || 360 || 110 || 43 || 1.9 || 1.4 || 12.6 || 3.7 || 16.4 || 5.0 || 2.0
|-
! scope="row" style="text-align:center" | 1989
|style="text-align:center;"|
| 3 || 15 || 20 || 12 || 230 || 57 || 287 || 89 || 18 || 1.3 || 0.8 || 15.3 || 3.8 || 19.1 || 5.9 || 1.2
|- style="background:#eaeaea;"
! scope="row" style="text-align:center" | 1990
|style="text-align:center;"|
| 3 || 21 || 13 || 9 || 284 || 89 || 373 || 104 || 47 || 0.6 || 0.4 || 13.5 || 4.2 || 17.8 || 5.0 || 2.2
|-
! scope="row" style="text-align:center" | 1991
|style="text-align:center;"|
| 3 || 18 || 11 || 11 || 235 || 125 || 360 || 79 || 39 || 0.6 || 0.6 || 13.1 || 6.9 || 20.0 || 4.4 || 2.2
|- style="background:#eaeaea;"
! scope="row" style="text-align:center" | 1992
|style="text-align:center;"|
| 3 || 16 || 30 || 14 || 211 || 101 || 312 || 84 || 34 || 1.9 || 0.9 || 13.2 || 6.3 || 19.5 || 5.3 || 2.1
|-
! scope="row" style="text-align:center" | 1993
|style="text-align:center;"|
| 3 || 18 || 36 || 37 || 242 || 100 || 342 || 120 || 17 || 2.0 || 2.1 || 13.4 || 5.6 || 19.0 || 6.7 || 0.9
|-style="background:#eaeaea;"
! scope="row" style="text-align:center" | 1994
|style="text-align:center;"|
| 3 || 24 || 79 || 47 || 295 || 80 || 375 || 151 || 36 || 3.3 || 2.0 || 12.3 || 3.3 || 15.6 || 6.3 || 1.5
|-
! scope="row" style="text-align:center" | 1995
|style="text-align:center;"|
| 3 || 20 || 77 || 46 || 233 || 44 || 277 || 109 || 25 || 3.9 || 2.3 || 11.7 || 2.2 || 13.9 || 5.5 || 1.3
|-style="background:#eaeaea;"
! scope="row" style="text-align:center" | 1996
|style="text-align:center;"|
| 3 || 6 || 15 || 8 || 50 || 11 || 61 || 25 || 5 || 2.5 || 1.3 || 8.3 || 1.8 || 10.2 || 4.2 || 0.8
|-
! scope="row" style="text-align:center" | 1997
|style="text-align:center;"|
| 3 || 5 || 7 || 8 || 27 || 6 || 33 || 13 || 3 || 1.4 || 1.6 || 5.4 || 1.2 || 6.6 || 2.6 || 0.6
|-style="background:#eaeaea;"
! scope="row" style="text-align:center" | 1998
|style="text-align:center;"|
| 3 || 21 || 40 || 17 || 154 || 56 || 210 || 71 || 26 || 1.9 || 0.8 || 7.3 || 2.7 || 10.0 || 3.4 || 1.2
|-
! scope="row" style="text-align:center" | 1999
|style="text-align:center;"|
| 3 || 2 || 3 || 0 || 13 || 6 || 19 || 9 || 1 || 1.5 || 0.0 || 6.5 || 3.0 || 9.5 || 4.5 || 0.5
|- class="sortbottom"
! colspan=3| Career
! 226
! 426
! 277
! 2656
! 898
! 3554
! 1103
! 315
! 1.9
! 1.2
! 11.8
! 4.0
! 15.7
! 4.9
! 1.5
|}

In popular culture

Australian cricketer Nathan Lyon is nicknamed "Garry", after Garry Lyon.

References

External links

Elite Sports profile
DemonWiki profile

1967 births
Living people
People from Devonport, Tasmania
Melbourne Football Club players
All-Australians (AFL)
Australian sportswriters
Australian children's writers
Victorian State of Origin players
Keith 'Bluey' Truscott Trophy winners
Australian rules football commentators
Australian television presenters
Australian rules footballers from Melbourne
Nine's Wide World of Sport
People educated at Melbourne High School
Melbourne Football Club captains
Kyabram Football Club players
Australian rules footballers from Tasmania
Australia international rules football team coaches